Iñigo Ed. Regalado (1 June 1888 feast day– 24 July 1976) was a Filipino poet, journalist, and novelist.  He was the son of Iñigo Corcuera Regalado, the renowned Tagalog printer and journalist.  His mother was Saturnina Reyes.<ref name=NHI>From the article about Iñigo Ed. Regalado's father: , Quote: "They had several children, the two known ones being Saturnina (married to Victor Villamil), and Iñigo Ed Regalado, who followed in his footsteps to become a renowned poet, and was a novelist, journalist, and politician as well.</ref> As an editor, Iñigo Ed Regalado was one of the "powerful voices" in the newspapers and magazines during the first part of the 1900s.  It was during his time when the Golden Age of the Tagalog Novel (1905–1921) started.  The whole period of the Golden Age of the Tagalog Novel was from 1905 to 1935.

Early life
He was born in Sampaloc, Manila. He received his Bachelor of Arts degree from the Liceo de Manila in 1907. He finished studying Law from the Academia dela Jurisprudencia on 1913. He became a writer in the newspapers Taliba, Ang Mithi (The Goal), Ang Watawat (The Flag), Pagkakaisa (Unity), the weekly newspaper Ilang-ilang, and Liwayway.

Career
He was one of the initiators of  the Surian ng Wikang Pambansa.  He became a language professor in different universities in Manila.  He was the dean of the Department of the Pilipino Language of the Centro Escolar University. He was also a former councilor of the City of Manila.

Literary achievements

Among his awarded works were the 1964 poem Tilamsik (literally splash [of water] or spark [of fire]), the 1941 compilation entitled Damdamin (feelings, emotion). Damdamin won the first prize during the first poetry competition during the time of the Commonwealth of the Philippines in 1941.  He wrote more than 26 novels.  His works belonged in "The Golden Age of the Tagalog Novel".  Among his well-known works was Prinsesa Urduja (Princess Urduja), a play that was presented in the Cultural Center of the Philippines. He also wrote for Telembang: Lingguhang Mapagpatawa at Manunukso, which published the first regular komiks strip in the Philippines entitled, Si Kiko at si Angge, in 1922. The strip was written by Regalado and illustrated by National Artist Fernando Amorsolo. It depicted the lives of Filipinos under the American colonial rule via the competing politics and points of view of its eponymous husband and wife.

Literary style
Regalado was careful in choosing descriptive words for his writing.  He used clear characterization, natural dialogues and settings for his novels and short stories.

Death
He died on 24 July 1974 because of lung cancer in Lourdes Hospital in Manila at the age of 88.

Works

Novels
The following are Regalado's novels:Madaling Araw (Dawn) (1909)Kung Magmahal ang Dalaga (How a Maiden Loves) (1911)Ang Labing-apat na Awa (The Fourteen Graces) (1912)Sampagitang Walang Bango (Jasmine Without Fragrance) (1921)May Pagsinta'y Walang Puso (Heartless Love) (1921)Ang Huling Pagluha (The Final Shedding of Tears) (1933)Ang Anak ng Dumalaga (Child of the Pullet) (1933)Naging Lunas ng Pighati (Became the Solution to Sorrow) (1933)Dalaginding (Young Maiden)

PoetrySabi Ko Na Nga Ba (That's What I Thought)Dahil sa Pag-ibig'' (Because of Love)

References

1888 births
1974 deaths
Filipino novelists
Filipino male poets
Deans (academic)
People from Sampaloc, Manila
Manila City Council members
Writers from Manila
Filipino journalists
Filipino dramatists and playwrights
Tagalog-language writers
Filipino editors
Language teachers
Filipino academic administrators
20th-century Filipino poets
20th-century novelists
20th-century dramatists and playwrights
20th-century male writers
20th-century journalists